William Pennell (March 3, 1889 – September 5, 1956) was an American voice actor and baritone singer, who was the original voice of the character Bluto on the animated Popeye shorts produced by Fleischer Studios. At the time, Pennell sang in a vocal quartet which was used by Paramount Pictures. Gus Wickie replaced Pennell as Bluto in 1935.

References

External links

American male voice actors
American baritones
Fleischer Studios people
1889 births
1956 deaths
20th-century American singers
20th-century American male singers